Rank comparison chart of non-commissioned officers and other personnel for armies/ land forces of Asian states.

Other ranks

See also
Comparative army enlisted ranks of the Americas
Ranks and insignia of NATO armies enlisted
Comparative military ranks of Korea

References

Military comparisons